The Supreme Knight of the Knights of Columbus (more simply referred to as the Supreme Knight) is the title of the chairman of the board and chief executive officer of the Knights of Columbus. The organization comprises approximately 1.9 million members in more than 15,000 councils and operates an insurance company with over $109 billion of life insurance in force, .

Since its founding in 1882, there have been 14 Supreme Knights. Patrick E. Kelly is the current Supreme Knight incumbent, holding this position since March 1, 2021.

References

Bibliography 

 
 

 
Knights of Columbus